Kazakhstani passports are issued to citizens of the Republic of Kazakhstan to facilitate international travel. Within the Republic of Kazakhstan citizens are required to use internal identification card which can also be used for travel to the Russian Federation, Kyrgyzstan and Albania. The Kazakhstani Ministry of Justice started issuing biometric passports on January 5, 2009.

Physical Appearance
Kazakh passports have cerulean colour cover with the words “” (Kazakh) and “PASSPORT” (English) at the bottom with the Republic of Kazakhstan coat of arms in the middle of the front cover. Passport contains 36 pages, including 30 visa pages, the data/information page and observations page. The first page contains inscription in two languages as follows:

 – in Kazakh (Cyrillic script) 

History
When Kazakhstan was within the USSR, Soviet passports were issued.

Identity Information Page

A Kazakhstani Passport includes the following data:

 Photo of the passport bearer
 Type
 Code (KAZ)
 Passport No.
 1 Surname Names
 2 Given Names
 3 Nationality
 4 Date of Birth
 5 Place of birth
 6 Sex
 8 Date of Issue
 9 Date of Expiry
 10 Issuing Authority

The information page ends with a machine readable zone.

Languages
The data page/information page is printed in Kazakh and English.

New biometric passports contain information in Kazakh and English only.

Visa requirements

In 2023, Kazakhstani citizens had visa-free or visa on arrival access to 90 countries and territories, ranking the Kazakhstani passport 71st in terms of travel freedom according to the Henley visa restrictions index.

See also
 Kazakhstani identity card
 Visa requirements for Kazakhstani citizens
 Visa policy of Kazakhstan

References

 

Kazakhstan
Passport